The Borderline is a police procedural television series produced by Hong Kong Television Network. Each episode costs HK$1 million to produce. The first episode premiered on November 19, 2014.

Cast
 Liu Kai-chi as To Yat-fei
 Dominic Lam as Cheung Gwan
 Leila Tong as Ting Siu-hoi
 Lawrence Chou as Choi Ying-yeung
 Joman Chiang as Fong Jou-man
 Annie Liew as Yip Mei-gyun
 Philip Keung as Tse Dai-hak
 Crystal Leung as Hui Lok-sa
 Calvin Lui as Chan Jeun-tai
 Deon Cheung as Ho Yi
 Lam Lei as Wong Chi-gin, guest star
 Yu Mo-lin as Yu Chat-hei
 Felix Lok as Cheuk Bak-san
 Wong Ching as Cheng Chiu
 Kathy Yuen as Rachel, guest star episode 11, 14, 16
 Luvin Ho as Pepper
 Wu Kwing-lung as Mok Siu-lung
 Oscar Li as Shek Bak-chung
 Dexter Young as Fung Wai-hung
 Karen Lee as Sum Yeuk-tung

References

External links
 Official website

2013 Hong Kong television series debuts
Hong Kong Television Network original programming
2010s Hong Kong television series
Hong Kong police procedural television series